The Four Symbols (literally meaning "four images"), are four mythological creatures appearing among the Chinese constellations along the ecliptic, and viewed as the guardians of the four cardinal directions. These four creatures are also referred to by a variety of other names, including "Four Guardians", "Four Gods", and "Four Auspicious Beasts". They are the Azure Dragon of the East, the Vermilion Bird of the South, the White Tiger of the West, and the Black Tortoise (also called "Black Warrior") of the North. Each of the creatures is most closely associated with a cardinal direction and a color, but also additionally represents other aspects, including a season of the year, an emotion, virtue, and one of the Chinese "five elements" (wood, fire, earth, metal, and water). Each has been given its own individual traits, origin story and a reason for being. Symbolically, and as part of spiritual and religious belief and meaning, these creatures have been culturally important across countries in the East Asian cultural sphere.

History
Depictions of mythological creatures clearly ancestral to the modern set of four creatures have been found throughout China. Currently, the oldest known depiction was found in 1987 in a tomb in Xishuipo (西水坡) in Puyang, Henan, which has been dated to approximately 5300 BC. In the tomb, labeled M45, immediately adjacent to the remains of the main occupant to the east and west were found mosaics made of clam shells and bones forming images closely resembling the Azure Dragon and White Tiger, respectively.

The modern standard configuration was settled much later, with variations appearing throughout Chinese history. For example, the Rong Cheng Shi manuscript recovered in 1994, which dates to the Warring States period (ca. 453–221 BCE), gives five directions rather than four and places the animals differently. According to that document, Yu the Great gave directional banners to his people, marked with the following insignia: the north with a bird, the south with a snake, the east with the sun, the west with the moon, and the center with a bear. The Chinese classic Book of Rites mentions the Vermillion Bird, Black Tortoise (Dark Warrior), Azure Dragon, and White Tiger as heraldric animals on war flags; they were the names of asterisms associated with the four cardinal directions: South, North, East, and West, respectively.

In Taoism, the Four Symbols have been assigned human identities and names. The Azure Dragon is named Meng Zhang, the Vermilion Bird is called Ling Guang, the White Tiger Jian Bing, and the Black Tortoise Zhi Ming. Its Japanese equivalent, in corresponding order: Seiryuu (east), Suzaku (south), Byakko (west), Genbu (North).

The colours associated with the four creatures can be said to match the colours of soil in the corresponding areas of China: the bluish-grey water-logged soils of the east, the reddish iron-rich soils of the south, the whitish saline soils of the western deserts, the black organic-rich soils of the north, and the yellow soils from the central loess plateau.

In I Ching 
The chapter  in the I Ching describes the origins of the Four Symbols thus:

Correspondence with the Five Phases

These mythological creatures have also been syncretized into the Five Phases system (Wuxing). The Azure Dragon of the East represents Wood, the Vermilion Bird of the South represents Fire, the White Tiger of the West represents Metal, and the Black Tortoise (or Black Warrior) of the North represents Water. In this system, the fifth principle Earth is represented by the Yellow Dragon of the Center.

See also

References

 
Chinese astrological signs
Chinese constellations
Chinese legendary creatures
Chinese mythology
4 Four Symbols